Clarksboro is an unincorporated community in Jackson County, in the U.S. state of Georgia.

History
Clarksboro once served as the county seat of Jackson County. The community was named after Elijah Clarke, an American military officer. A variant spelling is "Clarksborough".

References

Unincorporated communities in Jackson County, Georgia